"Understanding" is a song by American R&B group Xscape. Written by Manuel Seal,
the song was released as the group's second single from the group's 1993 debut album Hummin' Comin' at 'Cha. The song reached number eight on the Billboard Hot 100 and spent two weeks at number one on the Hot R&B Singles chart.

Release and reception
Released in December 1993, "Understanding" entered the Billboard Hot 100 singles chart the following month, and reached its peak of number eight in February 1994.
The single spent 14 weeks in the top 40 portion of the chart. The song went to number one on the Hot R&B Singles chart, where it spent two weeks at the top. In other Billboard charts, the song reached number seven on the Hot 100 Singles Sales chart and number 15 on the Hot 100 Airplay chart. In February, the single was certified gold in the United States and has since been certified Platinum in March 2023.
The song also reached number 24 in New Zealand.
The "Understanding" music video entered the most-played weekly charts at MTV and BET in late 1993, and the video reached number one on The Box for the week ending January 29, 1994.

When recording the 1995 album Off the Hook, group member Kandi Buruss compared "Understanding" favorably to "Just Kickin' It", the group's previous single. "I felt like I could sing 'Just Kickin' It' in my sleep. Songs like 'Understanding', which was more vocally complex, had real feeling to it and that's what we wanted more of on our next album." Fellow group member Tameka Cottle noted that the appeal of the song "was really universal."

Track listings
CD/Cassette Single
 "Understanding" (radio version)
 "Understanding" (remix)
 "Understanding" (Sexual Healing Mix)
 "With You" (LP version)

7" Vinyl Single
 "Understanding" (LP version) - 5:40
 "Just Kickin' It" (remix) - 3:44

Chart performance

Weekly charts

Year-end charts

Certifications

See also
R&B number-one hits of 1994 (USA)

References

External links
"Understanding" lyrics

1993 singles
Xscape (group) songs
Songs written by Manuel Seal
1993 songs
Columbia Records singles
Contemporary R&B ballads
Soul ballads
1990s ballads